Qanat Gav (also Romanized as Qanāt Gāv) is a village in Kiskan Rural District, in the Central District of Baft County, Kerman Province, Iran. At the 2006 census, its population was 24, in 9 families.

References 

Populated places in Baft County